The 1989 Palestine Cup of Nations for Youth was the third edition of the Palestine Cup of Nations for Youth. The tournament was held in three cities in Iraq, from 31 August to 14 September 1989.

Participating teams

Venues

Group stage

Group A

Group B

Group C

Group D

Knockout stage

Bracket

Final

References

Arab
Arab
August 1989 sports events in Africa
September 1989 sports events in Africa
August 1989 sports events in Asia
September 1989 sports events in Asia